Lars Brandstrup (13 April 1913 – 25 January 1997) was a Norwegian gallerist.

Biography
Brandstrup was born at Horten in Vestfold, Norway. He was raised in Denmark  and in 1950 he moved back to Norway. Brothers Lars  and Niels Brandstrup established Galleri F 15 in Moss during 1962. In retirement, he established Galleri Brandstrup  in Moss during 1986 along with his son, Kim Brandstrup. In 2002, Kim Brandstrup relocated the gallery  to Oslo.

He was decorated Knight of the Order of St. Olav, Knight of the Order of the Polar Star, and Knight of the Order of the Dannebrog. He was awarded the Arts Council Norway Honorary Award in 1985.

References

External links
Galleri Brandstrup Oslo  

1913 births
1997 deaths
People from Horten
Norwegian art dealers
Norwegian company founders
Knights of the Order of the Dannebrog
Knights of the Order of the Polar Star